is a national park in Kyūshū, Japan. It is composed of Kirishima-Kagoshima Bay, an area of Kagoshima Prefecture and Miyazaki Prefecture known for its active volcanoes, volcanic lakes, and onsen.

History

On March 16, 1934, it was first established as Kirishima-Yaku National Park. On March 16, 2012 Yakushima was split of as the separate Yakushima National Park  and Kirishima-Yaku National Park was renamed to Kirishima-Kinkowan National Park.

The area become famous as Japan's first honeymoon spot, because Ryoma Sakamoto took his wife Oryo there.

Kirishima was used as a filming location for the 1967 James Bond movie You Only Live Twice.

Kirishima
 Mount Kirishima
 Ebino-kōgen
 Takachiho-kawara
 Lake Miike
 Mount Kurino
 Mount Karakuni
 Mount Takachiho
 Cape Sata
 Sakura-jima
 Mount Kaimon
 Lake Ikeda

Major scenic spots
Kirishima area

Kagoshima Bay area

Related municipalities
 Miyakonojō
 Kobayashi
 Ebino
 Takaharu
 Kagoshima, Kagoshima
 Ibusuki
 Tarumizu
 Kirishima
 Yūsui
 Minamiōsumi

See also

List of national parks of Japan

References

External links
 Map of Area 1 (Mt Kirishima)
 Map of Area 2 (Kagoshima Bay)

 
National parks of Japan
Parks and gardens in Kagoshima Prefecture
Parks and gardens in Miyazaki Prefecture
Protected areas established in 1934